Very is a small lunar impact crater located in the eastern part of Mare Serenitatis, to the west-southwest of Le Monnier. It lies upon a wrinkle ridge that runs to the north and south named Dorsa Smirnov. It was named after American astronomer Frank W. Very. The crater was previously known as Le Monnier B, a satellite crater of Le Monnier, before being renamed by the IAU in 1973.

References

Further reading

External links

 LTO-42b3 Very — L&PI topographic map

Impact craters on the Moon
Mare Serenitatis